Sheikh Mahmood "Joe" Ahmad (born 25 June 1942) is a British field hockey player who competed in the 1972 Summer Olympics.

References

External links
 

1942 births
Living people
Field hockey players at the 1972 Summer Olympics
British male field hockey players
Olympic field hockey players of Great Britain